Benedict Dotu Sekey (born 10 August 1940 in Accra) was a Ghanaian clergyman and bishop for the Roman Catholic Diocese of Gbarnga in Liberia. He was ordained in 1967. He was appointed in 1986. He died in 2000.

References 

Ghanaian Roman Catholic bishops
1940 births
2000 deaths